Quantum Computing Since Democritus is a 2013 book on quantum information science written by Scott Aaronson. It is loosely based on a course Aaronson taught at the University of Waterloo, Canada, the lecture notes for which are available online.

Contents 
Aaronson has stated that he intends the book to be at the same level as Leonard Susskind's The Theoretical Minimum or Roger Penrose's The Road to Reality; Physics Today compared it to George Gamow's One Two Three... Infinity. The book covers everything from computer science to mathematics to quantum mechanics and quantum computing, starting, as the title indicates, with Democritus.

Author 
Scott Aaronson is a professor of theoretical computer science at the University of Texas at Austin. He was previously a member of faculty at MIT.

Reception 
Michael Nielsen called the book "a beautiful synthesis of what we know", while Seth Lloyd praised it as "lucid", describing Aaronson as a "tornado of intellectual activity".

The Journal of the American Mathematical Society considered it to have "much insight, wisdom, and fun", but conceded that it "is not for everyone'.

References 

Quantum computing
Quantum information theory